The 2017 New Orleans mayoral election was held on November 18, 2017. On October 14 all candidates competed on one ballot regardless of party registration (called the nonpartisan blanket primary or "Louisiana primary").

Incumbent Democratic Mayor Mitch Landrieu was term-limited and could not seek reelection. This was the first time since the 1977 New Orleans elections were held in the fall as opposed to February and March. In 2014, at Landrieu's request, the Louisiana State Legislature moved city elections from the spring, when New Orleans hosts the Mardi Gras and Sugar Bowl (and sometimes the Super Bowl). The change in schedule was made in an effort to improve voter turnout.

Candidates

Democratic Party

Declared 
 Thomas J. Albert Jr.
 Charles Anderson, visual artist and activist
 Michael Bagneris - former Civil District Court judge and 2014 mayoral candidate
 LaToya Cantrell -  New Orleans City Councilor, District B
 Desiree M. Charbonnet - former chief judge of the New Orleans Municipal Court
 Edward Collins Sr.
 Brandon Dorrington, wellness center coordinator with Delta Corps
 Troy Henry - businessman, founder of management consulting firm Henry Consulting, and 2010 mayoral candidate
 Frank Scurlock - businessman
 Johnese Smith
 Tommie A. Vassel, public accountant

Independent Party

Declared 
 Edward "Ed" Bruski, registered nurse
 Patrick Van Hoorebeek
 Hashim Walters

No-party affiliation

Declared 
 Manny "Chevrolet" Bruno
 Byron Stephan Cole
 Matthew Hill
 Derrick O'Brien Martin, executive director of the Algiers Economic Development Foundation and managing partner at Sugchairo, Moi & Martin

Polling

First round

Runoff

with Michael Bagernis and LaToya Cantrell

with Michael Bagernis and Desiree Charbonnet

Results

Mayoral primary, October 14

Notes
After the primary election third-place finisher former judge Michael Bagneris and fourth-place finisher businessman Troy Henry officially endorsed first-place finisher City Councilor LaToya Cantrell.

Mayoral runoff, November 18

References 

New Orleans
2017
New Orleans
21st century in New Orleans